Lloyd Mawson Pearson (13 December 1897 – 2 June 1966) was an English actor, who appeared mostly in character roles on stage and screen. He created the roles of Rat in Toad of Toad Hall in 1929 and Alderman Helliwell in the West End production of J. B. Priestley's When We Are Married in 1938, a role he reprised in the film version in 1943.

Life and career
Pearson was born in Cleckheaton, near Batley in the West Riding of Yorkshire, the son of William Edward Pearson and his wife Ada, né Farrar. He was educated at Whitcliffe Mount Grammar School and Owen's College. He then became a clerk in the Midland Bank. After serving in the armed forces in the First World War he studied for the stage at Lady Benson's Dramatic School and made his first appearance on the stage at the Palace Pier, Brighton in 1919 as the Police Officer in Diana of Dobson's. He made his first appearance in London at the St Martin's Theatre on 21 January 1920, as Lentulus in Pompey the Great, with Sir Frank Benson and remained with the Benson company for seven years, eventually playing the leading comedy parts in Shakespeare, Sheridan, Goldsmith and others. He then played a short season with the Birmingham Repertory Company, where he appeared as Launce in The Two Gentlemen of Verona. In 1927 he joined the company of the Playhouse Theatre, Liverpool, under William Armstrong, and remained until 1937, playing leading parts, including the Water Rat in the word premiere of Toad of Toad Hall.

He returned to London in 1937 and appeared as Viscount Pascal in The Switchback,  Tubby Pearson in Dodsworth, Harper in Nanny, and at the St Martin's in October 1938 he played Alderman Helliwell in the premiere of When We Are Married. In the later 1930s and 1940s he played mostly in modern comedies, including Arsenic and Old Lace (1944). At the Phoenix Theatre in May 1949 he made a rare excursion into costume drama, playing Gibbet in The Beaux' Stratagem, which ran for over a year. Later West End appearances included Mr Marsland in a revival of The Private Secretary (1954) and the Fire Brigade Captain in The Bald Prima Donna. In 1957 he took over the role of the Tramp in Salad Days for two and a half years.

Pearson died in London on 2 June 1966 aged 68.

Films
In addition to his stage career, Pearson acted in films from 1938 to 1964:

References

Sources

External links
 

1897 births
1966 deaths
English male film actors
People from Cleckheaton
20th-century English male actors
British military personnel of World War I